Thomas Craig (born Craig Thompson; 4 December 1962) is an English actor. He is known for his roles in Murdoch Mysteries, Where the Heart Is, Hidden, Coronation Street, and The Navigators.

Biography

Craig was originally a plumber before making the move into acting in the 1980s. He attended the Academy of Live and Recorded Arts. His stage name is taken from the name of former Sheffield Wednesday player Tommy Craig.

In 1994 he appeared sporadically in the first series of Common As Muck, alongside Edward Woodward and Neil Dudgeon and he also had a brief role in the 1995 film I.D., where he played one of the Tyneburn leaders during the market fight scene, his only word then was "Well!" when asking for a fight.

Craig appeared in EastEnders in 1992 as Mandy Salter's mother's boyfriend. Around 1994 he appeared as Aelfric in "Monk's Hood", an episode of the Cadfael television series starring Sir Derek Jacobi. He currently stars as Inspector Brackenreid in the Canadian show Murdoch Mysteries.

Filmography

Film

Television

External links

References

Living people
1962 births
Alumni of the Academy of Live and Recorded Arts
English male film actors
English male television actors
Male actors from Sheffield
Male actors from Yorkshire
English expatriates in Canada
20th-century English male actors
21st-century English male actors